Haresabad may refer to:
 Haresabad, Isfahan
 Haresabad, Razavi Khorasan